Yamamoto Station (山本駅) is the name of two train stations in Japan:

 Yamamoto Station (Hyogo)
 Yamamoto Station (Saga)